The New Zealand Outdoors & Freedom Party is a registered political party in New Zealand. The party is led by co-leaders Sue Grey and Donna Pokere-Phillips, and seeks to protect New Zealand's environment and "outdoors heritage".

Principles and policies
Founded as the New Zealand Outdoors Party, the party initially aimed to protect the environment and New Zealand's "outdoors heritage", and advocates for clean, full and unmodified rivers, greater protection from development for the conservation estate, large game animals to be managed by all hunters for recreation and conservation benefit, removal of ecologically destructive trawling practices within the inshore fishery and a Futures Commission to determine environmental limits to the growth of population, tourism, economy and infrastructure. Its policy platform later changed to include support for medicinal cannabis and opposition to the use of 1080 poison, vaccines, COVID-19 restrictions, and 5G technology.

History

Creation and 2017 election 
The New Zealand Outdoors Party was launched in September 2015 by co-leaders Alan Simmons and David Haynes with the aim of protecting New Zealand's environment and outdoor heritage. In its December 2016 newsletter, the party stated it was "pushing hard" to get to 500 members so that it could register. In a letter to Rural News, Simmons claimed the party "has possibly more members than some parties already in Parliament", though did not give figures.

On 22 July 2017 the party applied for registration with the Electoral Commission, and this was granted on 11 August 2017. The party stood four electorate candidates in Nelson, Taupō, Maungakiekie and Hutt South. The same four candidates were also on the party list for the 2017 general election. During the 2017 general election, the Outdoors Party gained 0.1% of the party vote and failed to win any seats in the New Zealand House of Representatives.

2020 election 
Following the de-registration of the Ban 1080 Party in 2017, many Ban 1080 supporters moved to the Outdoors Party. In January 2020 the party elected anti-1080 activist Sue Grey as its co-leader.

In March 2020 the party formed an alliance with the Real NZ Party, resulting in the founder and leader of Real NZ, David Moffett, being appointed to the Outdoor Party's board. The party subsequently received a broadcasting allocation of $51,821 for the 2020 election.

In April 2020 the party criticised a nationwide lockdown (a response to the COVID-19 pandemic) as "cruel and unreasonable" as it banned hunting and other outdoor activities. They also compared the New Zealand Government to the Nazi Party.

In June 2020, supporters of the party at a rally in Auckland claimed that the September 11 attacks were a false flag operation, promoted flat earth theories, and denounced "mind control" and 5G technology. They also harassed and threatened a young Asian woman after she wiped out chalk slogans saying "it's okay to be white" and "all lives matter". One supporter screamed at the woman to “go back to her own country”, while another said "she wasn't born here, she came here to create shit". Party co-leader Alan Simmons joined the confrontation and reprimanded the woman for her language, saying "you shouldn't be using language like that, a little girl like you". Party member Tracy Livingston, who was also present, tried to ease tension, telling those filming the event that the young woman was "not the enemy" and that everybody was "naturally racist". Party co-leader Sue Grey later told media that the people in the video were not members of the party, that the party did not condone their actions, and that two of the people in the incident had since apologised to her. Simmons also spoke to media afterwards, saying he had "protected the girl" from harm.

In August 2020 co-leader Sue Grey alleged that the Outdoors Party had been the target of a campaign of harassment by supporters of the New Zealand Public Party after it had rejected a takeover offer in April and refused to join an alliance with Advance New Zealand. Public Party leader Billy Te Kahika said that he found the behaviour "absolutely reprehensible" and asked his supporters not to abuse Grey. Te Kahika also said that “the worst and the filthiest behaviour has actually come from Outdoors Party supporters towards [the Public Party]", and that he remained opened to the Outdoors Party joining the alliance.

Around September 2020, at least six nominated candidates pulled out of the party or switched allegiance to other parties, including going to the New Zealand Public Party or the Social Credit Party or to found a new party called the Attica Project.

The party won 3,256 party votes in the election, or 0.1% of the total.

2022: NZ Outdoors & Freedom Party, Freedoms NZ, and Hamilton West by-election

In April 2022 the party officially changed its name to the NZ Outdoors & Freedom Party. The next month Donna Pokere-Phillips became co-leader in place of Simmons. Pokere-Phillips had previously stood in elections for the Māori Party (Te Pāti Māori, 2020), The Opportunities Party (TOP, 2017), and the Alliance (1999).

On 23 August 2022 The Freedoms & Rights Coalition, led by Brian Tamaki, held a protest and "people's court" outside Parliament. In his speech to the gathering Tamaki announced that a new umbrella party, Freedoms NZ, would be formed through a union of the Outdoors & Freedom Party, Vision NZ (led by his wife Hannah), and the nascent New Nation Party. He said that a memorandum of understanding existed between two of the constituent parties and invited other minor parties to join. The Outdoors & Freedom Party responded on Facebook to say that Tamaki's announcement was premature, and that the party had not reached a final decision on whether to join Freedoms NZ. Freedoms NZ was not a registered party by the time of the protest, and no further details were given about leadership or how the constituent parties like Outdoors & Freedom would work with each other to run as a single organisation.

Vision NZ and Outdoors & Freedom entered separate candidates in 2022 Hamilton West by-election, the first vote to be held after the formation of Freedoms NZ. Donna Pokere-Phillips was the Outdoors & Freedom candidate, and received 125 votes, less than 1% of the total. This result came a few weeks after she placed fourth in Hamilton's mayoral election and third in the city council's new Maori Ward, which elected only two members.

Electoral results

See also

Outdoor Recreation New Zealand

References

External links
 

Political parties in New Zealand
Anti-vaccination organizations
Recreational political parties
Political parties established in 2015
2015 establishments in New Zealand